Autoroute 5 (A-5, also known as the Autoroute de la Gatineau) is a short controlled-access Autoroute in the Outaouais region of western Quebec. It connects the central urban area of Gatineau (formerly Hull) with the recreational areas of Gatineau Park and the exurban rural areas of Chelsea and La Pêche. The southern terminus provides access to the Macdonald-Cartier Bridge, which continues into downtown Ottawa. The A-5 generally has four lanes of traffic (two per direction) with the exception of southernmost section across the Macdonald-Cartier Bridge where A-5 widens to six lanes (three per direction). 

Part of Route 148 overlapped A-5 from Autoroute 50 to Boulevard Saint-Raymond until completion of Boulevard des Allumettières in 2007. With the completion of Boulevard des Allumettières, Route 148 was rerouted onto the southern leg of Autoroute 50 and then west towards Aylmer on Boulevard des Allumettières. Autoroute 5 is the only Quebec A-class Autoroute to have only 1 digit in its name.

Route description 

Autoroute 5 begins at the Ontario-Quebec border on the MacDonald-Cartier Bridge, which is 6 lanes wide. Upon hitting land, Autoroute 5 loses 2 lanes and interchanges with Boulevard Maisonneuve/Boulevard Fournier and Autoroute 50 in quick succession. It then curves northwest, interchanging with Boulevard du Casino, providing access to Casino du Lac-Leamy. Autoroute 5 services Gatineau with two more interchanges before leaving the urban area, where a grass median forms. Autoroute 5 then interchanges with Chemin Old Chelsea and Chemin Scott, which provide access to Gatineau Park as well as Chelsea. The expressway then meanders through forested land, largely parallel to Route 105. At Exit 28, Route 105 joins Autoroute 5 in a concurrency until the end of Autoroute 5, which occurs 3.5 km later, bypassing the hamlet of Wakefield. Autoroute 5 gradually loses its median and center divider before ending at a T-intersection, where Route 105 continues east.

The speed limit on Autoroute 5 is 100 km/h north of Boulevard du Casino, and 70 km/h south of it.

History 

Until October 2014 there had been two segments of A-5 for several years:

 The second segment, built in 1993, was a short four-lane, at-grade expressway bypass of Wakefield, which overlapped Route 105 and Route 366. The MTQ plan to eliminate the discontinuity between the two segments was completed in October 2014. Further extensions of A-5 north of Wakefield have been deemed unnecessary given the current AADT on Route 105.

A  extension of the southern segment past Tulip Valley, an area of Route 105 that has been the site of multiple fatal incidents in the past, was opened on 4 December 2009 following a $27 million extension project. Another $115 million  project began in 2010 to connect the south and north segments, completing the carriageway to Wakefield in October 2014.

Beginning in June 2008, the MTQ began replacing the concrete surface from Ottawa to Saint-Joseph Boulevard with asphalt after multiple incidents in which pieces of concrete broke out from the surface including one that struck the windshield of a vehicle, killing its driver in November 2007. Construction was completed by the end of 2008.

Exit list

Gallery

References

External links

Google Maps: Autoroute 5 from Ontario border to Chelsea
A-5 at Quebec Autoroutes
Transports Quebec Map 

05
Streets in Gatineau
Roads in Outaouais